83rd Brigade may refer to:

 83rd Guards Air Assault Brigade (Russia)
 83rd Mixed Brigade (Spain)
 83rd Brigade (United Kingdom)

See also

 83rd Division (disambiguation)
 83rd Regiment (disambiguation)